Dor is a rural locality (a village) in Kubenskoye Rural Settlement, Vologodsky District, Vologda Oblast, Russia. The population was 49 as of 2002.

Geography 
The distance to Vologda is 76 km, to Kubenskoye is 24 km. Nekrasovo, Kolotilovo, Bilkovo are the nearest rural localities.

References 

Rural localities in Vologodsky District